Lauer may refer to:

People
 Lauer (surname), and people with this surname

Places
 Lauer (river), a river in Bavaria, Germany
 Lauer, Indiana, an unincorporated community in Perry County, Indiana, United States
 Lauer, Norway, a small island in the Hvaler municipality

See also
 Bob deLauer (1920–2002), American football player 
 Laur, Nueva Ecija, a municipality in Nueva Ecija, Philippines
 Laur (surname), an Estonian name
 Laure (disambiguation)